Harmochirus is a genus of the spider family Salticidae (jumping spiders).

This small genus is very close to Bianor; it seems to replace it where Bianor itself is missing, especially in rainforest habitats.

Species
, the World Spider Catalog accepted the following species:

 Harmochirus ahmedi Biswas, 2016 – Bangladesh
 Harmochirus bianoriformis (Strand, 1907) – Central and East Africa, Madagascar
 Harmochirus brachiatus (Thorell, 1877) (type species) – India, Bhutan to Taiwan, Indonesia
 Harmochirus duboscqi (Berland & Millot, 1941) – Ivory Coast, Senegal
 Harmochirus exaggeratus Caleb & Mathai, 2015 – India
 Harmochirus insulanus (Kishida, 1914) – China, Korea, Japan
 Harmochirus lloydi Narayan, 1915 – India
 Harmochirus luculentus Simon, 1886 – Africa, Zanzibar, Yemen
 Harmochirus pineus Xiao & Wang, 2005 – China
 Harmochirus zabkai Logunov, 2001 – India, Nepal, Vietnam

References

Further reading
 Logunov D.V. (2001). "A redefinition of the genera Bianor Peckham & Peckham, 1885 and Harmochirus Simon, 1885, with the establishment of a new genus Sibianor gen. n. (Araneae: Salticidae)". Arthropoda Selecta 9(4): 221-286.

External links
 Photograph of H. luculentus

Salticidae genera
Spiders of Africa
Spiders of Asia
Salticidae